The Department of Revenue is a department of the South Carolina state government responsible for the administration of 32 different state taxes in South Carolina.
  
The Department is responsible for licensing and taxing all manufacturers, wholesalers and retailers of alcoholic liquors. The Department is also responsible for enforcing the Bingo Act of 1996 which affects manufacturers, distributors, organizations and promoters. Coin-operated device tax is collected from all manufactures, distributors or owners of such devices or machines. Owners of such machines must also be licensed.

Tax records theft
On August 13, 2012, an unidentified remote attacker compromised systems at the Department of Revenue. The attacker initially penetrated the system using phishing emails to employees. The attacker then installed a backdoor. Over the next two months, the attacker remotely compiled and downloaded data such as employee password hashes and the tax records dating from 1998 to 2011. On October 10, the United States Secret Service notified the SC Department of Revenue of a possible breach. The attacker ceased activities on October 17, having compromised a total of 44 systems.

As of early 2013, this is the largest ever cyberattack on a US state government, with 3.8 million unencrypted Social Security numbers (equivalent to over 78% of South Carolina's population) stolen along with private and business-related financial information. South Carolina contracted with private credit-reporting agency Experian to provide South Carolina residents and other affected individuals with a year of free credit monitoring and identity theft protection.

References

External links

State alcohol agencies of the United States
Taxation in South Carolina
Revenue
US state tax agencies